Loren Nerell (born November 30, 1960) is an American composer and performer of ambient American music and Balinese gamelan.

As a composer, Loren has written music for film, theater, dance, and interactive multi-media. He has performed with the Kronos Quartet, has recorded eleven albums of original work, has appeared on several compilations such as Dali: The Endless Enigma, Soundscape Gallery 3, and Weightless, Effortless, and has made guest appearances on recordings such as Steve Roach's Artifacts, Paul Haslinger's World Without Rules, Djam Karet's Collaborator,  and L. Subramaniam's Global Fusion. He spent several months in Java and Bali studying native styles of gamelan music, some of which he has performed in the greater Los Angeles area with other gamelan enthusiasts.

Loren Nerell was born in Long Beach, California. His early interest in electronic music began when he heard the Tangerine Dream album Rubycon. With it, he crossed over into a world of music that previously did not exist for him. He studied analog synthesis at Long Beach Community College eventually moving to San Diego State University where he was exposed to tape manipulation and tape composition techniques. He also began performing and studying Balinese gamelan music, and the microtonal composition of Harry Partch. From San Diego, Loren moved to California State University Dominguez Hills where he delved into computer synthesis, utilizing their Synclavier system.

After mastering the techniques he learned in school, he developed his own studio, stocking it with an array of vintage sound modules as well as the latest technology. He has worked in the music industry as a sound designer including a position at Oberheim Electronics, a synthesizer manufacturer, and as a recording engineer.

Loren received a Bachelor of Science degree in Anthropology and Geography from Cal Poly Pomona and a Master of Arts degree in ethnomusicology from UCLA. His thesis is on the ceremonial gamelan music of Bali called lelambatan. Loren currently works in UCLA's Herb Alpert School of Music as a recording technician.

Discography

Solo albums
 Point of Arrival - Cassette (1986) reissued on vinyl (2011)
 Book of Alchemy - Cassette  (1989)
 Lilin Dewa - CD  (1996)
 Indonesian Soundscapes - CD (1999)
 The Venerable Dark Cloud - mini-CD (2000) reissued as a full length CD (2016)
 Taksu - CD (2003)
 Slow Dream - CD (2012)
 Live at Soundquest Fest 2010 - download (2018)
 The Gong Prophet - CD (2021)

Collaboration albums
 Terraform - CD (2006) – with Steve Roach (reissued in 2009)
 Intangible - CD (2011) - with A Produce
 Tree Of Life - CD (2014) - with Mark Seelig
 Cave Dwellers - CD (2018) - with Mark Seelig

See also 
List of ambient music artists

References

External links

Loren Nerell discography at Discogs

1960 births
Living people
American male composers
21st-century American composers
Soleilmoon artists
21st-century American male musicians